Breath is a 2017 Australian sports drama film based on the novel of the same name by Tim Winton, and directed by Simon Baker, from a screenplay that Baker and Winton co-wrote with Gerard Lee. Baker also stars in the film alongside Elizabeth Debicki, Samson Coulter, Ben Spence and Richard Roxburgh.

It premiered at the 2017 Toronto International Film Festival and the 2017 Zurich Film Festival. It was released on 3 May 2018 in Australia by Roadshow Films, and on 1 June 2018 in the United States by FilmRise.

Plot

In the 1970s two teenage surfer boys, Pikelet and Loonie, growing up in a small town meet and form a connection with an older surfer named Sando, who challenges them to take greater and more dangerous risks.

Cast 
 Simon Baker as Sando
 Elizabeth Debicki as Eva
 Samson Coulter as Pikelet
 Ben Spence as Loonie
 Richard Roxburgh as Mr Pike
 Rachael Blake as Mrs Pike

Production 
The film is the feature directorial debut of Simon Baker, who also acted in the film and produced it with Mark Johnson and Australian Jamie Hilton. Johnson met Tim Winton in America where he was on a book tour and obtained an option on the book. Winton wrote the first screenplay with the final script by Gerard Lee, Baker and Winton. Financing was provided by "the Australian art councils and... from Screen Australia to ScreenWest", Great Southern Development Commission and Autumn Productions. The Western Australian Government contributed $2.3 million in a bid to promote the state as a premier filming location.

Themes 
Producer Mark Johnson said, "It's got universal themes—about being desperately afraid that you're ordinary, about being afraid as a young man that there's nothing exceptional about you—and I think that has great application in a universal way, but this is also a specifically Western Australian story". Simon Baker's view is that "Tim's book viscerally captures the restless curiosity and yearning for identity that often defines our coming of age".

Filming 
The Western Australian coastal town of Denmark, part of the Great Southern region, is the location for filming. For Tim Winton this was an ideal location; "The Great Southern region has had an enormous impact on my life and work so I'm very pleased this film is being shot on the beaches and streets and forests that inspired the book."

Reception

On review aggregator website Rotten Tomatoes, the film holds an approval rating of 80%, based on 50 reviews, and an average rating of 6.63/10. The website's critical consensus reads, "A coming of age drama with a surfing twist, Breath navigates seemingly familiar waters — but has surprising depth below the surface." On Metacritic, the film has a weighted average score of 71 out of 100, based on 14 critics, indicating "generally favorable reviews".

Accolades

References

External links 
 

2017 films
Films scored by Harry Gregson-Williams
Films set in Western Australia
Films set in the 1970s
Australian sports drama films
2010s sports drama films
2010s English-language films
Screen Australia films
Roadshow Entertainment films